is a Japanese voice actor, singer and narrator. He is married to voice actress Ao Takahashi.

Career
Tachibana graduated from Aojijuku Tokyo School 18th term. In 2003, he made his voice acting debut as Kyuu in the television anime E's Otherwise. He was affiliated with Production Baobab until May 2011. He joined Axlone since June of the same year.

On January 5, 2017, a blog reported that he married with Ao Takahashi.

On March 31, 2018, he left Axlone, and in April of that same year, he co-founded BLACK SHIP agency together with fellow voice actor Jun Fukuyama.

Filmography

Anime
2003
Da Capo, student (ep 3)
D.N.Angel, classmate (ep 21)
E's Otherwise, Kyuu

2004
Akane Maniax, Male student (ep 1)
Futakoi, Man (ep 9)
Keroro Gunso, Curious onlooker (ep 19)
Midori Days, Customer (ep 8); Friend B (ep 5)

2005
Bokusatsu Tenshi Dokuro-chan, Matsunaga (ep 2); Yoshida (ep 5,7)
Minami no Shima no Chiisa na Hikouki Birdy, Robert

2006
Fushigiboshi no Futago Hime Gyu!, Thomas
Ghost Hunt, Man (ep 11)
Higurashi no Naku Koro ni, Man B (ep 25); Villager (ep 4)
Kiba, Gale (ep 5,6); Herrick; Police E (ep 1); Rebellion Soldier (ep 3); Street Soldier (ep 2)
Love Get Chu, Shinsuke Yamashita
Mamoru-kun ni Megami no Shukufuku wo!, Takayuki Watanabe
Tonagura!, Fanclub member A (ep 7,8); Male student (ep 5)

2007
Gakuen Utopia Manabi Straight!, Takefumi Amamiya
Myself ; Yourself, Sana Hidaka
Romeo × Juliet, Benvolio
Nodame Cantabile, Tomoharu Katayama
Saint Beast, Middle Angel
My Bride Is a Mermaid, Bob

2008
Sekirei, Minato Sahashi
Xam'd: Lost Memories, Furuichi Teraoka
Toradora!, Stalker Man

2009
Inazuma Eleven, Yuuki Tachimukai

2010
Kuroshitsuji, Soma Asman Kadar
Uragiri wa Boku no Namae o Shitteiru, Luze Crosszeria (Luka's twin brother), Uzuki
Sekirei: Pure Engagement, Minato Sahashi
Jewelpet Twinkle, Jinnai Yuma

2011
Itsuka Tenma no Kuro Usagi, Taito Kurogane
Yumekui Merry, Takateru Akiyanagi
Kami-sama no Memo-chō´, Shinozaki Toshi
Oniichan no Koto Nanka Zenzen Suki Janain Dakara ne!! (Keiichirō Kishikawa)
Pokémon: Black & White: Rival Destinies, Yuto (Ep 61-62)
Sekai-ichi Hatsukoi, Chiaki Yoshino
Stardust wink, So Nagase
Nyanpire, Vampire

2012
Bakuman. 3, Toru Nanamine
Ginga e Kickoff!!, Ryuuji Furuya
Mobile Suit Gundam AGE, Gren Raize
Tight Rope, Naoki Satoya
Kamisama Hajimemashita, Tomoe
Zero no Tsukaima, Vittorio Serevare (Season Four)

2013
Gundam Build Fighters, Nils Nielsen
Makai Ouji: Devils and Realist, Beelzebub
My Mental Choices are Completely Interfering with my School Romantic Comedy, God

2014
Haikyuu!!, Morisuke Yaku
Kuroshitsuji: Book of Circus, Prince Soma Asman Kadar
Mekakucity Actors, Shuuya Kano
Majin Bone, Luke
The Pilot's Love Song, Benjamin Sharif
Tokyo Ghoul, Seidō Takizawa
Gundam Build Fighters Try, Nils Nielsen

2015
Kamisama Kiss◎, Tomoe
Go! Princess PreCure, Prince Kanata
Minna Atsumare! Falcom Gakuen SC, Jusis Albarea
Tokyo Ghoul √A, Seidō Takizawa
Makura no Danshi, Yayoi Chigiri
Huyao Xiao Hongniang, Fan Yun Fei
Haikyu!! 2nd Season, Morisuke Yaku
Yamada-kun to 7-nin no Majo, Shinichi Tamaki
Overlord, Peroroncino

2016
Big Order, Yoshitsune Hiiragi
D.Gray-man Hallow, Howard Link, replacing Daisuke Kishio who voiced him in the 2006 D.Gray-Man series.
Sekkō Boys, Medici
Macross Delta, Norman Claus
Nobunaga no Shinobi, Akechi Mitsuhide
Age 12: A Little Heart Pounding, Inaba Mikami
Hitori no Shita: The Outcast, Xu Si
Udon no Kuni no Kiniro Kemari, Hiroshi Nagatsuma
Trickster (anime), Haruhiko Hanasaki

2017
Oushitsu Kyoushi Heine, Maximillian
Hitorijime My Hero, Asaya Hasekura
Konbini Kareshi, Mikado Nakajima
Love and Lies, Yūsuke Nisaka
Nekopara (OVA), Kashou Minaduki
Nobunaga no Shinobi: Ise Kanegasaki-hen, Mitsuhide Akechi
Ousama Game The Animation, Naoya Hashimoto
Hitori no Shita: The Outcast 2nd Season, Xu Si
Dynamic Chord, Tokiharu Hanabusa

2018
Beyblade Burst Super Z, Suoh Goshuin
Tokyo Ghoul:re, Seidō Takizawa
Nobunaga no Shinobi: Anegawa Ishiyama-hen, Mitsuhide Akechi
Yume Ōkoku to Nemureru 100-Nin no Ōji-sama, Gilbert
Senjūshi, Charleville
Boarding School Juliet, Aby Ssinia
Angolmois: Record of Mongol Invasion, Kagesuke Shōni

2019
Meiji Tokyo Renka, Yakumo Koizumi
To the Abandoned Sacred Beasts, Daniel Price (Spriggan)
Kochoki: Wakaki Nobunaga, Takugen Sōon
Demon Slayer: Kimetsu no Yaiba, Rui's Father

2020
number24, Ikuto Yufu
Nekopara, Kashou Minaduki
A Destructive God Sits Next to Me, Kimikage Mogami
IDOLiSH7 Second Beat!, Yuki
Plunderer, Robert Du Vanvigh
The Misfit of Demon King Academy, Leorig Indu

2021
IDOLiSH7 Third Beat!, Yuki
How Not to Summon a Demon Lord Ω, Banakness

2022
Mahjong Soul Pong, Hideki Akitomo
Trapped in a Dating Sim: The World of Otome Games Is Tough for Mobs, Brad Fou Field
Blue Lock, Aoshi Tokimitsu

2023
Chillin' in My 30s After Getting Fired from the Demon King's Army, Lizette

Original video animation
Kamisama Hajimemashita, Tomoe (2013)
Yamada-kun to 7-nin no Majo, Shinichi Tamaki (2014)
Kuroshitsuji: Book of Murder, Soma Asman Kadar (2015)
Haikyuu!!: Lev Genzan!, Morisuke Yaku (2015)
Gundam Build Fighters Try: Island Wars, Nils Nielsen (2016)
Kamisama Hajimemashita: Kako-hen, Tomoe (2016)
Trick or Alice, Shizuku Minase (2016)

Theatrical animation
Gekijōban Meiji Tokyo Renka: Yumihari no Serenade, Yakumo Koizumi (2015)
Haikyuu!! Movie 1: Owari to Hajimari, Morisuke Yaku (2015)
Peace Maker Kurogane Movie 1: Omou Michi, Suzu Kitamura (2018)
Ten Count, Tadaomi Shirotani (2023)

Tokusatsu
2016
 Doubutsu Sentai Zyuohger, Gakkarize (Ep 43)

Digital comics
Bakuman (voice comic) (Akito Takagi)

Video games

Infinite Undiscovery (2008)  (Capel)
Valkyrie Profile: Covenant of the Plume (2008) (Kristoph)
Atelier Rorona: The Alchemist of Arland (2009) (Yksel Jahnn)
Record of Agarest War Zero (2009) (Sieghart) 
Last Escort: Club Katze (2010) (Tsubasa)
Tokimeki Memorial Girl's Side: 3rd Story (2010) (Seiji Shitara)
Atelier Totori: The Adventurer of Arland (2010) (Yksel Jahnn) 
Final Fantasy XIV: A Realm Reborn (2013) (Alphinaud, member of the "Scions of the Seventh Dawn") 
Si-Nis-Kanto (2013) (Eshika)
The Legend of Heroes: Trails of Cold Steel (2013) (Jusis Albarea)
Snow Bound Land (2013) (Orva)
Houkago Colorful*Step ~Bunka-bu!~ (2014) (Uguisu Hinayama)
Touken Ranbu (2015) (Koryuu Kagemitsu)
Xenoblade Chronicles X (2015) (Custom Male Avatar)
Crash Fever (2015) (Zhuangzi)
IDOLiSH7 (2015) (Re:vale Yuki)
Dissidia Final Fantasy (2015) (Ramza Beoulve)
Bleach: Brave Souls (2016) (Seinosuke Yamada)
Boyfriend (Kari 2016) (Amane Keito)
Epic Seven (2017) (Cidd)
Sdorica -Sunset- (2018) (Ned Garcia Alznar, Charle Ceres)
Saint Seiya Awakening (2019) (Gemini Saga)
Ayakashi: Romance Reborn (2019) (Shizuki)
Lord of Heroes (2020) (Laphlaes Selkena)
Gate of Nightmares (2021) (Allen Nanatori, Leonys Aubreo)
Arknights (2022) (Shalem)

Drama CDs
 Cuticle Detective Inaba (Kei Nozaki)
 Di(e)ce (Kazuki Naruse)
 Kamisama Kiss (Tomoe)
 Persona 3 (Keisuke Hiraga)
 Ten Count (Tadaomi Shirotani)
 Last Game (Souma Kei)
 Bloody+Mary (Ichirou Rosario di Maria)
 Saiyuki Ibun (Houmei)
 Otona Keikenchi (Yumeji)
 Alice=Alice (Sanngatsu Usagi)
 Someone Special (Reo Haruyama)
 Yuugen Romantica (Iriya)
 Mo Dao Zu Shi/Ma Dou So Shi (Xiao Xingchen/Kyou Shinjin)

Dubbing

Live-action
The Comebacks (Randy Randinger)
iCarly (Harry)
Maleficent (Prince Phillip)
Shoebox Zoo (John Roberts)
The Signal (Nic Eastman (Brenton Thwaites))
Son of a Gun (JR (Brenton Thwaites))
 The Untamed (trailer only) (Lan Wangji (Wang Yibo))

Animation
Batman: The Brave and the Bold (Ryan Choi/Atom)
Foster's Home for Imaginary Friends (Dylan)
The Incredible Hulk (Rick Jones)
Mo Dao Zu Shi (Lan Wangji)

References

External links
  
 Official agency profile 
 Shinnosuke Tachibana at GamePlaza-Haruka Voice Acting Database 
 Shinnosuke Tachibana at Hitoshi Doi's Seiyuu Database
 

1978 births
Living people
Japanese male video game actors
Japanese male voice actors
Male voice actors from Gifu Prefecture
People from Gifu
Production Baobab voice actors
Square Enix people
21st-century Japanese singers
21st-century Japanese male singers